Vagitanus is a genus of cicadas in the family Cicadidae. There are about seven described species in Vagitanus.

Species
These seven species belong to the genus Vagitanus:
 Vagitanus guangxiensis (Chou & Wang, 1993) c g
 Vagitanus longidactyla (Yang & Wei, 2013) c g
 Vagitanus luangensis Distant, 1918 c g
 Vagitanus metulata (Chou & Lei, 1993) c g
 Vagitanus terminalis (Matsumura, 1913) c g
 Vagitanus vientianensis Distant, 1918 c g
 Vagitanus virescens (Kato, 1926) c g
Data sources: i = ITIS, c = Catalogue of Life, g = GBIF, b = Bugguide.net

References

Further reading

 
 
 
 

Cicadatrini
Cicadidae genera